The 2003–04 Eastern European Hockey League season, was the ninth and final season of the multi-national ice hockey league. Nine teams participated in Division A, Six teams participated in Division B, and seven teams participated in the EEHL Cup. HK Keramin Minsk won Division A, HK Vitebsk won Division B, and Titan Klin won the EEHL Cup.

Division A

Division B

Playoffs

Semifinals
Junior Minsk - HK Gomel 5-1, 6-2

Final
Junior Minsk - HK Vitebsk 4-1, 2-4, 4-1

EEHL Cup

External links
2003-04 season on hockeyarchives.info

2
Eastern European Hockey League seasons